A professional submissive is a person who performs the submissive role in BDSM activities in exchange for money. Most professional submissives do not have sex with their clients. 

Professional submissives are rarer than professional dominants.

References

External links 
 
 

BDSM terminology
Sex workers
submissive